Goa Fort  is a fort located 15 km from Dapoli, in Ratnagiri district, of Maharashtra. This fort is one of the three forts built to guard the Suvarnadurg fort, the other two forts are Kanakdurg and Fatte durg.  The fort is a main tourist attraction in the Harne village. A favourite evening haunt for the thrill likers to chill out, Chapora Fort in North Goa is yet another popular destination for the patrons.

History 
Much less history is known about this fort. In 1862 it is reported that there were 19 cannons and 200 soldiers on the fort

How to reach 
The nearest town is Dapoli. The fort is at walkable distance from the Harne town. A wide motorable road leads to the entrance gate of the fort. It takes about half an hour to have a walk around the fort.

Places to see 
There are two entrance gate in the fort. One facing the landward side and the other facing the sea. There are various sculptures on the walls of the fort. There are remains of the collector's rest house on the fort.

See also 
 List of forts in Maharashtra
 List of forts in India
 Kanhoji Angre
 Marathi People
 Maratha Navy
 List of Maratha dynasties and states
 Maratha War of Independence
 Battles involving the Maratha Empire
 Military history of India
 List of people involved in the Maratha Empire

References 

Buildings and structures of the Maratha Empire
Forts in Ratnagiri district
16th-century forts in India
Caves of Maharashtra
Tourist attractions in Konkan
Former populated places in India